Olcay Çetinkaya (born 28 October 1979) is a Turkish former professional footballer. He played as a goalkeeper.

Career
He also played for Kepez Belediyespor, Çanakkale Dardanelspor, Zonguldakspor, Karabükspor, Gebzespor, Kartalspor, Yıldırım Bosnaspor, Bandırmaspor, Küçükköyspor, Fatih Karagümrük, Muğlaspor, Aydınspor.

References

External links

Futbolmerkezi.com profile

1979 births
Footballers from Istanbul
Living people
Turkish footballers
Association football goalkeepers
Dardanelspor footballers
Zonguldakspor footballers
Kardemir Karabükspor footballers
Gebzespor footballers
Kartalspor footballers
Yıldırım Bosna S.K. footballers
Bandırmaspor footballers
Fatih Karagümrük S.K. footballers
Muğlaspor footballers
Aydınspor footballers
Yalovaspor footballers
İstanbulspor footballers
Balıkesirspor footballers
Kırklarelispor footballers
Tokatspor footballers
Süper Lig players
TFF Second League players